Jerzy Snopek (born 3 August 1952, Wrząca) is a Polish literary historian and translator. He served as an ambassador to Hungary from 2016 to 2022.

Life 
Snopek graduated from Polish philology at the University of Warsaw. He gained there also doctoral degree. In 1993, he received his post-doctoral degree (habilitation) at the Institute of Literary Research of the Polish Academy of Sciences, presenting a dissertation on the literary life in the Kraków area from 1750 to 1815.

He worked as a Polish literature lecturer at the Faculty of Humanities of the Eötvös Loránd University in Budapest (1985–1990). He co-operated also with the Central European University at that time. Between 1991 and 1997, he was secretary at the Hungarian Cultural Institute in Warsaw, and between 1995 and 2006 he held the post of scientific director at the Institute of Literary Research of the Polish Academy of Sciences. He has been a visiting professor at the Pázmány Péter Catholic University in Hungary. In 2002, he was among the founders of the Warsaw University of Humanities where he lectured for the following ten years. Since 2002, he has been an active member of the Stefan Żeromski Heritage Foundation.

On 28 October 2016, Snopek was nominated to be the ambassador to Hungary, and was subsequently presented with his letter of credence on 23 November 2016. He ended his term on 31 March 2022.

He is married to Márta Gedeon.

Works 
Snopek wroteauthored over 400 articles and essays, and two books: 
 Jerzy Snopek, Objawienie i oświecenie: z dziejów libertynizmu w Polsce, Polska Akademia Nauk. Instytut Badań Literackich, Wrocław 1986.
 Jerzy Snopek, Węgry: zarys dziejów i kultury, Jerzy Snopek, Warszawa 2002.

Translations
 Antoni Cetnarowicz, Csaba G. Kiss, István Kovács (ed.), Węgry – Polska w Europie Środkowej: historia – literatura: księga pamiątkowa ku czci profesora Wacława Felczaka, Kraków: Instytut Historii Uniwersytetu Jagiellońskiego, 1997.
 István Kovács, Polacy w węgierskiej Wiośnie Ludów 1848–1849 : „Byliśmy z Wami do końca”, Warszawa 1999.
 Csaba Gy. Kiss (ed.), Strażnik pamięci w czasach amnezji: Węgrzy o Herbercie, Warszawa 2008.

Honours 
 Literatura na Świecie prize of the year for the best poetic translation
 Order of Merit of the Kingdom of Hungary
 Teleki Medail (2018)

References 

1952 births
20th-century translators
21st-century translators
Ambassadors of Poland to Hungary
Academic staff of Eötvös Loránd University
Living people
Polish essayists
Male essayists
Polish literary historians
Polish translators
Translators from Polish
Translators to Hungarian
University of Warsaw alumni
Polish male non-fiction writers